The 2011 LKL All-Star Game was held on March 12, 2011, in Šiauliai Arena. Time Team, composed of foreign players, played against Lietuviai, which was composed of Lithuanian players.

Rosters

 Dainius Šalenga was replaced by Mindaugas Kuzminskas, because of the termination of his contract with Žalgiris.

 Khalid El-Amin was replaced by Rashaun Broadus, due to a serious leg injury.

Coaches
Antanas Sireika, of Šiauliai, was chosen as the head coach of Team Lietuviai, while Aleksandar Trifunović, of Lietuvos Rytas, was chosen as the head coach of the Time Team.

External links 
 LKL.com

Lietuvos krepšinio lyga All-Star Game
All Star